Rikard Karlberg (born 1 December 1986 ) is a Swedish professional golfer. He won the 2015 Open d'Italia on the European Tour after winning a play-off against Martin Kaymer. He has also won twice on the Asian Tour and won the 2007 Nordic Golf League order of merit.

Early life and amateur career
Rikard Karlberg was born on 1 December 1986 in Gothenburg, Sweden. He represented Sweden at the 2003 European Boys' Team Championship in the Czech Republic and at the 2004 European Youths' Team Championship in Ireland.

Professional career
He turned professional in 2006. He topped the Nordic League rankings in 2007 to earn a tour card on the Challenge Tour. His best finish on the Challenge Tour was T4 at the 2008 Reale Challenge de España.

Karlberg earned his 2010 Asian Tour card through qualifying school. He won the second Asian Tour event he played, the SAIL Open. Later in the year, he won his second Asian Tour title at the Hero Honda Indian Open.

Karlberg earned a 2015 European Tour card through qualifying school, and won the Open d'Italia during his rookie season, after holing a birdie putt on the second extra hole in a play-off against Martin Kaymer.

He finished runner-up at the 2016 BMW PGA Championship en route to a career-best 69th a month later on the Official World Golf Ranking and a season finish of 34th in the Race to Dubai.

After battling illness which forced him to step away from competitive golf, he holed a 50-foot birdie putt on the final hole of 2019 Qualifying School to earn the final European Tour card for 2020.

At the 2021 Dubai Duty Free Irish Open in early July, Karlberg finished runner-up, after holing a chip from the greenside rough on the 72nd hole. The achievement earned him €314,170 in prize money and a late spot at The 149th Open Championship two weeks later.

Professional wins (8)

European Tour wins (1)

European Tour playoff record (1–0)

Asian Tour wins (2)

Nordic Golf League wins (4)

Other wins (1)
2009 Stenungsund Open (Swedish Golf Ranking)

Results in major championships
Results not in chronological order in 2020.

CUT = missed the half-way cut
NT = No tournament due to COVID-19 pandemic

Results in World Golf Championships

"T" = Tied

Team appearances
Amateur
European Boys' Team Championship (representing Sweden): 2003
 European Youths' Team Championship (representing Sweden): 2004

See also
2014 European Tour Qualifying School graduates
2019 European Tour Qualifying School graduates

References

External links
 

Profile on Golfdata.se 

Swedish male golfers
European Tour golfers
Asian Tour golfers
Sportspeople from Gothenburg
1986 births
Living people